White Oak High School is a public high school located in the city of White Oak, Texas, in Gregg County, United States and classified as a 3A school by the UIL.  It is a part of the White Oak Independent School District located in west central Gregg County.   In 2015, the school was rated "Met Standard" by the Texas Education Agency.

Athletics
The White Oak Roughnecks compete in these sports - 

Volleyball, Cross Country, Football, Basketball, Powerlifting, Swimming, Golf, Tennis, Track, Softball & Baseball

State titles
Boys Basketball - 
1953(B), 1957(B), 2012(2A), 2013(2A)
Boys Track - 
1949(B), 1958(B), 1972(1A),
Volleyball - 
2010(2A)
UIL Lone Star Cup Champions 
2012(2A)
UIL State Military Marching Contest Champions 2021

Notable alumni
Mike Barber, former NFL player
Dick Fugler, former NFL player
Byron Hunt, former NFL player
Max McGee, former NFL player
Kelcy Warren, billionaire oil businessman
Russell Wayt, former NFL player

References

External links
White Oak ISD website
White Oak Band Website

Public high schools in Texas
Schools in Gregg County, Texas